E3 ubiquitin-protein ligase LNX is an enzyme that in humans is encoded by the LNX1 gene.

Interactions 

LNX1 has been shown to interact with NAGK, NUMB and PAFAH1B3.

References

Further reading